Jarai may refer to:
Jarai people
Jarai language